Salvador Piera Bresca (born 18 May 1991) is a Spanish field hockey player. At the 2016 Summer Olympics, he competed for the national team in the men's tournament.

References

Living people
Spanish male field hockey players
Field hockey players at the 2016 Summer Olympics
Olympic field hockey players of Spain
1991 births
2014 Men's Hockey World Cup players